Bartolomeo Gradenigo (1636–1698) was a Roman Catholic prelate who served as Bishop of Brescia (1682–1698),
Bishop of Treviso (1668–1682),
and Bishop of Concordia (1667–1668).

Biography
Bartolomeo Gradenigo was born in Venice, Italy in March 1636 and ordained a priest on 9 Oct 1667.
On 14 Nov 1667, he was appointed by Pope Clement IX as Bishop of Concordia.
On 20 Nov 1667, he was consecrated bishop by Pietro Vito Ottoboni, Cardinal-Priest of San Marco, with Carlo Stefano Anastasio Ciceri, Bishop of Alessandria della Paglia, and Francesco Grassi, Bishop of Nona, serving as co-consecrators.

On 27 Feb 1668, he was appointed by Pope Clement IX as Bishop of Treviso.
On 13 Jul 1682, he was appointed by Pope Innocent XI as Bishop of Brescia.

He served as Bishop of Brescia until his death on 29 Jul 1698.

References 

Bishops appointed by Pope Clement IX
Bishops appointed by Pope Innocent XI
1636 births
1698 deaths
17th-century Roman Catholic bishops in the Republic of Venice